The Little Wanderer is a 1920 American silent drama film directed by Howard M. Mitchell and starring Shirley Mason, Raymond McKee and Cecil Van Auker.

Cast
 Shirley Mason as Jenny
 Raymond McKee as Larry Hard
 Cecil Van Auker as Joe Farley 
 Alice Wilson as Kit
 Jack Pratt as Tully

References

Bibliography
 Solomon, Aubrey. The Fox Film Corporation, 1915-1935: A History and Filmography. McFarland, 2011.

External links
 

1920 films
1920 drama films
1920s English-language films
American silent feature films
Silent American drama films
American black-and-white films
Films directed by Howard M. Mitchell
Fox Film films
1920s American films